Panipat Junction railway station is located in Panipat district in the Indian state of Haryana and serves  the historic and industrial town of Panipat.

History

The Delhi–Panipat–Ambala–Kalka line was opened in 1891.

Sabjimandi–Sonipat–Panipat–Karnal sector was electrified in 1992–1995.

Panipat–Jind line and Panipat–Rohtak line were electrified in 2018–19.

The railway station
Panipat junction railway station is a major junction in Delhi-NCR. In Panipat 118 trains halt here with 40,000 person travels daily. It is an A grade category station. It has 5 platforms for trains. It has major facilities available like many ticket counters, automatic ticket machine, fully computerized ticket reservation, automatic water machine, AC waiting hall, well shed sheltered, washroom, foot overbridge, water facility, book stall, lift, wi-fi connectivity, food stalls, bicycle stand, auto stand, car stand, CCTV camera, mall yard, washing line and other facilities. Major trains stops for Shatabdi, Jan Shatabdi, Sampark Kranti, Garib Rath, AC Express, Superfast, Mail-Express, Intercity, Ladies Special EMU and other Passenger trains.

Panipat Junction has been selected for upgrading under the "400 Stations" development project.

Existing rail lines
Delhi–Kalka line, Delhi–Amritsar line,
Delhi–Jammu line,
Panipat–Jind line,
Panipat–Rohtak line
connected and upcoming purposed Panipat–Meerut line via Muzaffarnagar,
Panipat–Haridwar line,
Panipat-Rewari double line,via Asthal Bohar,Jhajjar or Bypass by the Rohtak Junction
Panipat-Assoti Double line via Farukh Nagar,Patli,Manesar,Palwal.

Construction projects for new rail lines 
Delhi–Chandigarh–Amritsar high-speed rail corridor, 459 km corridor costing 1 lakh crore, has bene approved by the railway board and construction will commence in year 2028. The route will pass through Delhi–Panipat–Ambala–Chandigarh–Ludhiana–Jalandhar–Amritsar

National Capital Region Transport Corporation approved Delhi–Panipat RRTS. Construction work will start in year 2023. Cost of this corridor around 21,627 crore. At four major stops in Panipat: Panipat Depot, Panipat North, Panipat South and Samalkha.

Panipat–Meerut rail line, costing Rs 3540 crore, construction work will commence in year 2023.

Delhi–Chandigarh semi-high-speed rail corridor with 200 km/hr via Ambala Cantt and Panipat will commence construction work in 2023. Cost of this corridor 11,218 crore.

See also
 Railway in Haryana
 Highways in Haryana

References

External links
 Trains at Panipat
 

Railway stations in Panipat district
Delhi railway division
Railway junction stations in Haryana
Railway stations in India opened in 1897
Transport in Panipat